Zimovsky is a rural locality (a khutor) in Krasnolipovskoye Rural Settlement, Frolovsky District, Volgograd Oblast, Russia. The population was 30 as of 2010.

Geography 
Zimovsky is located on south of Frolovsky District, 32 km southwest of Prigorodny (the district's administrative centre) by road. Vyezdinsky is the nearest rural locality.

References 

Rural localities in Frolovsky District